This article details the fixtures and results of the Singapore national football team in 2009.

References

National Team
Results 2009
2009 national football team results